is a passenger railway station located in the city of Matsuyama, Ehime Prefecture, Japan. It is operated by the private transportation company Iyotetsu.

Lines
During most of the day, railway trains arrive every fifteen minutes. Trains continue from Matsuyama City Station on the Yokogawara Line to Yokogawara Station. The station is also served by the Ōtemachi Line tram line. At this station, the Takahama Line and Ōtemachi Liine cross each other, forming a level junction. This is the only example of a right angle level junction in Japan.

Layout
Ōtemachi  Station is a staffed station with a two sets of opposed side platforms.

Adjacent stations

|-
!colspan=5|Iyotetsu

History
The Ōtemachi tram line  opened on a May 1936. The stations were combined on a July 1953.

Surrounding area
Matsuyama Station
Shikoku Gas Matsuyama Head Office
Matsuyama Municipal Hospital

See also
 List of railway stations in Japan

References

External links

Iyotetsu Station Information

Iyotetsu Takahama Line
Railway stations in Ehime Prefecture
Railway stations in Japan opened in 1927
Railway stations in Matsuyama, Ehime